Unneruskollen Island is an ice-covered island lying north of Halvfarryggen Ridge and between Ekstrom Ice Shelf and Jelbart Ice Shelf, on the coast of Queen Maud Land. First mapped by the Norwegian-British-Swedish Antarctic Expedition (NBSAE) (1949-1952), led by John Schjelderup Giæver, it was named Unneruskollen by the Norwegian Antarctic Expedition, 1956–60.

See also 
 List of antarctic and sub-antarctic islands

References

Islands of Queen Maud Land
Princess Astrid Coast